Amelita "Ming" Jara Martinez-Ramos (born December 29, 1926) is a former First Lady of the Philippines. She is the widow of Fidel V. Ramos.

Early life
Ramos was born Amelita Jara Martinez to Rufino Martinez and Josefa Jara Martinez, both from La Paz, Iloilo (now a district of Iloilo City). Her father was the country’s first US-trained naval architect, while her mother was the country’s pioneer social worker.

She started playing badminton at the age of 16 and was then hired as clerk by the Metropolitan Water District (now Metropolitan Waterworks and Sewerage System).

Education and career
Ramos earned a Bachelor of Science degree in Physical Education from Boston University's Sargent School. She later earned Master of Science in Physical Education and Recreation from the University of California, Los Angeles. She became a national champion swimmer and badminton player. She then joined International School Manila in 1955, when its campus was then located in Pasay. There, she worked as secretary to the assistant headmaster, physical education teacher, director of testing, director of admissions, and registrar, respectively. She retired from ISM in 2022; she is its longest serving personnel.

As First Lady
In many ways, Ramos was a remarkable Presidential spouse, despite possessing a rather retiring character. Many past bearers of the title were homemakers, albeit as hostesses of Malacañang Palace; Ramos raised some eyebrows in conservative circles when, after her husband's accession following the three-way 1992 elections, she refused to resign as the registrar of International School Manila, which was then located in Makati. Despite her new, exalted rank as consort to the head of state, she dutifully reported to the registrar's office much to the delight of female professionals.

She was a particularly visible advocate of sport, a field outside the traditional realm of First Ladies. An active sportswoman herself, she was most associated with badminton, having served as president of the Philippine Badminton Association. Her achievements in the environmental field are considerable as well, having campaigned for the rehabilitation and conservation of the Pasig River, which received prominent attention during her husband's rule. She continues to be active in efforts devoted to the Pasig.

In 1994, she led the development of the Orchidarium in Rizal Park, Manila, where an orchid named Ascocenda Amelita Ramos is named after her. She also established Ming’s Garden, a plant nursery and events venue in Silang, Cavite which also has a Filipino restaurant.

Personal life
She married Fidel V. Ramos, who was then an army officer, on October 21, 1954 at the Central Church (now known as Central United Methodist Church) in Manila. Together, they have five daughters: Angelita Ramos-Jones, Josephine Ramos-Samartino, Carolina Ramos-Sembrano, Cristina Ramos-Jalasco, and Gloria Ramos. They also have eight grandsons and five granddaughters. He died on July 31, 2022 due to complications from COVID-19.

In the early hours of June 27, 2011, Ramos' daughter, Josephine, died of lung cancer at the age of 54 at The Medical City in Pasig, Metro Manila. The former president admitted shortly after that Josephine, the second of their five daughters, was a smoker for 25 years who had only disclosed her illness to the family five weeks before her death.

Aside from being a sportswoman, Ramos is also recognized as a talented amateur pianist, performing on several occasions with the Executive Combo Band of Raul Manglapus.

Honour
:
: Dame Commander of the Order of Civil Merit (September 2, 1994) 
: Dame of the Collar of the Order of Isabella the Catholic (March 25, 1995)

References 

|-

|-

1926 births
Living people
Fidel V. Ramos
Amelita
People from Manila
People from Pangasinan
First Ladies and First Gentlemen of the Philippines
Filipino United Methodists
Filipino female badminton players
Filipino swimmers
Filipino educators
Visayan people
Spouses of presidents of the Philippines
Boston University alumni
University of California, Los Angeles alumni